Tom, Thomas or Tommy Keene may refer to:

 Tom Keene (actor) (1896–1963), American film actor
 Tom Keene (radio host) (born 1952), American radio host associated with Bloomberg Radio
 Tommy Keene (1958–2017), American singer-songwriter
 Thomas W. Keene (1840–1898), American stage actor
 Thomas G. Keen, American Baptist minister

See also 
 "Tom Keen", an episode of the crime drama The Blacklist
 Tom Kean (disambiguation)
 Thomas Keane (disambiguation)